Nektarios Azizi (born 4 November 2000) is a Greek professional footballer who plays as a forward.

Career

Youth career
Born in Heraklion, Azizi began playing football at the infrastructure segments of local club Ergotelis. His performances drew the attention of many major clubs in Greece and eventually, Superleague powerhouse PAOK arranged for his transfer to the PAOK Academy in the summer of 2016, where Azizi played for the club's U15 and U17 squads over a two-year period. In 2018, Azizi returned to Crete joining Superleague side OFI's U19 squad. In the summer of 2019, Azizi returned to Ergotelis, where he signed his first professional contract in August.

Club career
Azizi began his professional career playing for both the Ergotelis U19 squad as well as the first team. He made his debut for the seniors on 6 December 2019, coming in as a second-half substitute for Antonis Bourselis in the 73rd minute in the Super League 2 match-up against Levadiakos.

Career statistics

References

External links

2000 births
Living people
Super League Greece 2 players
Ergotelis F.C. players
Association football forwards
Footballers from Heraklion
Greek footballers